Straight Shootin' is a 1927 American silent Western film directed by William Wyler. It is a silent five-reel Western released by Universal Pictures as part of their Blue Streak Series.

Cast
 Ted Wells as Jack Roberts
 Garry O'Dell as Malpai Joe
 Buck Connors as John Hale
 Lillian Gilmore as Bess Hale
 Joseph Bennett as Tom Hale 
 Wilbur Mack as 'Black' Brody
 Al Ferguson as Sheriff

References

External links

 
 
 Straight Shootin' at Turner Classic Movies

1927 films
1927 Western (genre) films
American black-and-white films
Silent American Western (genre) films
1920s English-language films
1920s American films